Bill Johnsen is a New Zealand former rugby league footballer who represented New Zealand.

Playing career
Johnsen played for the West Coast and represented the South Island in 1969.

In 1974 he played for the New Zealand national rugby league team, playing in a three match series against Great Britain. That year he also won the West Coast Rugby League's Player of the Year award.

References

Living people
New Zealand rugby league players
New Zealand national rugby league team players
West Coast rugby league team players
Rugby league centres
South Island rugby league team players
Year of birth missing (living people)